Gomeldon is a small village in the valley of the River Bourne in Wiltshire, England, in the civil parish of Idmiston.

There is a primary school and, although there is no station, the main railway line to London passes through the village.

Gomeldon was a village in medieval times. Ten buildings on the ancient village site south-west of the school, between the modern village and the river, were excavated in the 1960s, and a report published by Salisbury Museum. The site of the deserted village is designated as a scheduled monument.

In 1821 the population was 20, and in 1831 there were 48 inhabitants. In 1868 it was a small hamlet in the parish of Idmiston.

References

External links 

Villages in Wiltshire
Deserted medieval villages in Wiltshire